Hanney was an ancient ecclesiastical parish about  north of Wantage in the Vale of White Horse. It included the villages of East Hanney and West Hanney (known collectively as "The Hanneys") and Lyford. Hanney was part of Berkshire until the 1974 boundary changes transferred the Vale of White Horse to Oxfordshire.

History
The villages were formerly islands in marshland, hence the Old English "-ey" ending of their toponyms. Charney Bassett, Childrey and Goosey are other nearby examples.

Parish churches
The parish church of Saint James the Great, West Hanney was the mother church of the parish. The church of St. Mary, Lyford was built in the Middle Ages as a dependent chapel. East Hanney had a dependent chapel of St. James by 1288 but it was dissolved in the 16th century. A new chapel of St. James the Less was built in the 1850s but then made redundant in the 20th century.

References

Sources

External links
 TheHanneys
 www.geograph.co.uk : photos of East and West Hanney and surrounding area

Vale of White Horse